Suraj Kumar (born 29 November 1988) is an Indian-born cricketer who plays as wicketkeeper for the Oman national cricket team.

Early life
Suraj was born in Jalandhar, India in Nepalese immigrant family. His parents were originally from Baglung, Nepal. He moved to Oman as a teenager to work for a company, and started his cricket career in Oman.

Career
In October 2018, he was named in Oman's squad for the 2018 ICC World Cricket League Division Three tournament in Oman. He played in Oman's opening fixture of the tournament, against Kenya on 9 November 2018. In December 2018, he was named in Oman's team for the 2018 ACC Emerging Teams Asia Cup.

In March 2019, he was named in Oman's team for the 2019 ICC World Cricket League Division Two tournament in Namibia. He made his List A debut for Oman against the United States in the 2019 ICC World Cricket League Division Two tournament on 20 April 2019. Oman finished in the top four places in the tournament, therefore gaining One Day International (ODI) status. Kumar made his ODI debut for Oman on 27 April 2019, against Namibia, in the tournament's final.

In September 2019, he was named in Oman's squads for the 2019–20 Oman Pentangular Series and the 2019 ICC T20 World Cup Qualifier tournament. He made his Twenty20 International (T20I) debut for Oman, against Hong Kong, on 5 October 2019. In November 2019, he was named in Oman's squad for the 2019 ACC Emerging Teams Asia Cup in Bangladesh. In September 2021, he was named in Oman's squad for the 2021 ICC Men's T20 World Cup.

References

External links
 

1988 births
Living people
Omani cricketers
Oman One Day International cricketers
Oman Twenty20 International cricketers
Indian emigrants to Oman
Indian expatriates in Oman
Cricketers from Jalandhar
Omani Hindus